Eyvallah is a Turkish and Persian phrase with Arabic origin similar to OK. It is also a Turkish way of greeting others by putting your right hand on your chest. It may also refer to:

Eyvallah (Işın Karaca album), album by Turkish singer Işın Karaca
"Eyvallah", 1997 song by İzel from her album Emanet
"Eyvallah", 1998 song by Turkish singer Emrah İpek from his album Dura Dura
"Eyvallah", 1998 song by Turkish singer Gülşen from her album Erkeksen
"Eyvallah", 2013 song by the Turkish band Duman during the Gezi Park protests in Istanbul
"Eyvallah", 2018 song by Turkish singer Resul Dindar

See also
"Evala" (meaning Eyvallah), a song in Bulgarian and Turkish by Bulgarian singer Azis